Ethyl chloroacetate is a chemical compound used primarily in the chemical industry.  It is used as a solvent for organic synthesis and as an intermediate in the production of pesticides (such as sodium fluoroacetate).

An example for the use of this agent was in the synthesis of Cinepazet.

References

Alkylating agents
Ethyl esters
Acetate esters
Organochlorides